The Australian Lightwing SP-2000 Speed is an Australian light-sport aircraft, designed and produced by Australian Lightwing of Ballina, New South Wales. The aircraft is supplied as a kit for amateur construction or as a complete ready-to-fly-aircraft.

Design and development
The aircraft features a cantilever low-wing, a two-seats-in-side-by-side configuration enclosed cockpit, fixed tricycle landing gear or conventional landing gear and a single engine in tractor configuration.

The aircraft fuselage is made from welded steel tubing covered in non-structural fibreglass. Its  span wing is built from 6061-T6 aluminum covered in doped aircraft fabric and fibreglass. Standard engines available are the  Rotax 912ULS or the  Jabiru 3300 four-stroke powerplants. Cockpit access is via gull-winged doors on both sides. Wheel pants are usually fitted.

The SP-2000 has been accepted by the US Federal Aviation Administration as a light-sport aircraft as the Outback 2.

Specifications (SP-2000 Speed)

References

External links

Homebuilt aircraft
Light-sport aircraft
Single-engined tractor aircraft
Australian Lightwing aircraft